Albert E. Bodwell (1851–1926) was an American architect and designer from Concord, New Hampshire.

Life and career
He was born in Sanbornton in 1851. His education is unknown, but in 1881 he briefly joined with Manchester architect William M. Butterfield. Soon afterward he relocated to Concord, where he became associated with the firm of Dow & Wheeler. In 1882 he was admitted to the partnership, and the firm became Dow, Wheeler & Bodwell. After only a year or two, Bodwell stepped down from his partnership and became the firm's head designer, and so designed many of Dow's major late works.

In June 1892 he left the firm (now Dow & Randlett) and established his own firm, Bodwell & Sargent, with Charles E. Sargent. The firm was locally prominent, and practiced until 1897, when Bodwell moved to Lawrence, Massachusetts, where he became noted as a historian.

Legacy
As an architect, Bodwell contributed to at least three buildings individually listed on the National Register of Historic Places, in addition to at least two works that contribute to listed historic districts.

Architectural works

Dow, Wheeler & Bodwell, 1882-c.1883
 1882 - Memorial Arch, Tilton Arch Park, Northfield, New Hampshire
 1883 - Northfield Union Church, Sondogardy Pond Rd, Northfield, New Hampshire

For Dow & Wheeler and Dow & Randlett, c.1884-1892
 1887 - Charles C. Danforth House, 39 Green St, Concord, New Hampshire
 Demolished.
 1888 - Odd Fellows Building, 18 Pleasant St, Concord, New Hampshire

Bodwell & Sargent, 1892-1897
 1893 - Hiram O. Marsh House, 48 South St, Concord, New Hampshire
 1894 - Gilmanton Academy, 503 Province Rd, Gilmanton, New Hampshire
 1894 - St. James Episcopal Church, 53 Pleasant St, Laconia, New Hampshire
 1897 - Kenrick Block, 420 Central St, Franklin, New Hampshire

References

1851 births
1926 deaths
Architects from New Hampshire
19th-century American architects
People from Sanbornton, New Hampshire